Mantell is a surname. Notable people with the surname include:

David Mantell (1934—2017), English cricketer
Elizabeth Mantell (1941–1998), Scottish midwife and nurse
G. D. Mantell, 10th Surveyor General of Ceylon
Gideon Mantell (1790–1852), British obstetrician, geologist and palaeontologist
Joe Mantell (1915–2010), American actor
Mary Ann Mantell, palaeontologist
Richard Mantell (b. 1981), British field hockey player
Robert B. Mantell (1854–1928), Scottish actor
Simon Mantell (b. 1984), British field hockey player
Thomas F. Mantell (d. 1948), American pilot
Walter Mantell (1820–1895), New Zealand scientist and politician

See also 
 Mantle (disambiguation)
 Mantel (disambiguation)
 Ord Mantell, a fictional planet in the Star Wars franchise